Tunceli District is a district of Tunceli Province in Turkey. The town of Tunceli is its seat and the district had a population of 39,610 in 2021.

Composition 
Beside the town of Tunceli, the district encompasses fifty-three villages and 156 hamlets.

Villages 

 Alaçık
 Altınyüzük
 Ambar
 Atadoğdu
 Atlantı
 Babaocağı
 Baldan
 Başakçı
 Batman
 Baylık
 Böğürtlen
 Buğulu
 Burmageçit
 Cılga
 Çalkıran
 Çemçeli
 Çıralı
 Çimenli
 Çukur
 Dedeağaç
 Demirkapı
 Dikenli
 Dilek
 Doludizgin
 Doluküp
 Düzpelit
 Eğriyamaç
 Erdoğdu
 Geyiksuyu
 Gökçek
 Gömemiş
 Gözen
 Güleç
 Gürbüzler
 Haceri
 Kanoğlu
 Karşılar
 Kocakoç
 Kocalar
 Kopuzlar
 Köklüce
 Kuyluca
 Meşeyolu
 Okurlar
 Pınar
 Sarıtaş
 Sinan
 Suvat
 Tahtköy
 Tüllük
 Uzuntarla
 Yeşilkaya
 Yolkonak

References 

Districts of Tunceli Province
Tunceli District